Vector most often refers to:
Euclidean vector, a quantity with a magnitude and a direction 
Vector (epidemiology), an agent that carries and transmits an infectious pathogen into another living organism

Vector may also refer to:

Mathematics and physics
Vector (mathematics and physics)
Row and column vectors, single row or column matrices
Vector space
Vector field, a vector for each point

Molecular biology
Vector (molecular biology), a DNA molecule used as a vehicle to artificially carry foreign genetic material into another cell
Cloning vector, a small piece of DNA into which a foreign DNA fragment can be inserted for cloning purposes
Shuttle vector, a plasmid constructed so that it can propagate in two different host species
Viral vector, a tool commonly used by molecular biologists to deliver genetic materials into cells

Computer science
Vector, a one-dimensional array data structure
Distance-vector routing protocol, a class of routing protocols
Dope vector, a data structure used to store information about an array
Feature vector, an n-dimensional vector of numerical features that represent some object
Interrupt vector, the location in memory of an interrupt handling routine
Initialization vector, a fixed-size input to a cryptographic primitive
Vector clock, an algorithm
Vector space model,  an algebraic model for representing text documents
Vector (C++), a type in the C++ Standard Template Library
Euclidean vector, a geometric object with a direction and magnitude
Vector graphics, images defined by geometric primitives as opposed to bitmaps
Vector monitor, a display device used for early computers
Vector game, any video game that uses a vector graphics display
Vector (malware), approach used, or vulnerability exploited, in attacking a computer system

Transportation

Vehicles

Aircraft
Aerodyne Systems Vector, an ultralight aircraft
Hall Vector 1, a glider

Nautical vessels
, a Philippine tanker ship
, a 1967 hydrographic survey vessel in the Canadian Coast Guard

Automotive vehicles
Pinzgauer High-Mobility All-Terrain Vehicle (ATV) (Vector), a military patrol vehicle
VECTOR, a Dutch light utility vehicle
Vector, a variant of the Saab 9-3 automobile
Vector Motors sports cars
Vector M12
Vector W2
Vector W8
Vector WX-3
Vector SRV8

Other transportation
Thrust vectoring, directing aircraft jet thrust

Entertainment

Characters and fictional elements
Vector (Battle Angel Alita)
Vector (comics), Marvel Comics
Vector (G.I. Joe), vehicle
Vector the Crocodile, in the Sonic the Hedgehog series
Septima Vector, a Hogwarts professor in the Harry Potter universe
Vector, a Barian Emperor from Yu-Gi-Oh! Zexal
Vector class in Wipeout games
Victor "Vector" Perkins in Despicable Me (film), 2010
Vector, in the game Resident Evil: Operation Raccoon City
Vector, a weapon in the series Elfen Lied
Vector, a location in the video game Final Fantasy VI
Vector Industries, an organization in the Xenosaga video game series

Games
Vector (game), 1970 board game
Vector (video game), 2010
Vectorman, 1995, for Sega

Music
Vector (band), 1980s
Vector (Haken album), 2018
Vector (rapper) (b. 1983), Nigerian
Martin Wheeler, aka Vector Lovers

Other entertainment
Vector, an entertainment robot by the company Anki

Literature
Vector (magazine), the critical journal of the British Science Fiction Association
Vectors (journal), a defunct online journal covering digital humanities
The Vector (newspaper), a student-run newspaper of the New Jersey Institute of Technology
Vector (novel), a 1999 novel by Robin Cook
Vector Prime, a 1999 Star Wars novel written by R. A. Salvatore
Vector 13, a comic strip in the 2000 AD anthology

Business
Vector Informatik, a software tool and components provider for development of embedded electronics
Vector Engineering, multinational engineering, procurement, construction management, and operations service provider
Vector Graphic, an early manufacturer of 8-bit microcomputers
Vector Group, a publicly traded holding company, focusing on tobacco and real estate
Vector Limited, a New Zealand gas and electricity supplier
Vector Marketing, a multi-level knife marketing company
Vector Motors, an automobile manufacturer
Vector Launch, an American space technology company, 2016–2019
State Research Center of Virology and Biotechnology VECTOR, a biological research center in Russia

Other uses
Interval vector in musical set theory
KRISS Vector, a .45 ACP submachine gun
Light verb, or vector verb, in grammar
Parker Vector, pens
Vector Arena, Auckland, New Zealand
Vector Map, a collection of Earth GIS data
Vector 2022, a Wikipedia skin

See also

Vectra (disambiguation)
Vectorization (disambiguation)
Vector graphics (disambiguation)
Vektor (disambiguation)